Dream with Dean is a 1964 studio album by Dean Martin, produced by Jimmy Bowen.

This was the first of two albums that Martin released in 1964. Dream with Dean peaked at 15 on the Billboard 200. The album features "Everybody Loves Somebody" with a quartet accompaniment, Martin was to re-record the song with strings later in 1964, and it would become his second single to top the Billboard Hot 100.

Reception

The initial Billboard review from 22 August 1964 praised the selection of material on the album and wrote that "As long as the performer is Dean Martin, you've got to see the words "sales" and "airplay" light up".

Joe Viglione on Allmusic.com gave the album three stars out of five. Viglione said that if the album had "one drawback, it is that the 12 songs are incessant in their providing the same atmosphere...not only a very pleasant listening experience, it shows what a tremendous vocalist Dean Martin truly was". Vigilone describes Martin as performing as if "he were a lounge singer at 1:15 a.m. as the Saturday night crowd is dwindling".

Track listing 

"I'm Confessin' (That I Love You)" was re-recorded for 1973's You're the Best Thing That Ever Happened to Me.
"I Don't Know Why (I Just Do)" was originally cut for 1957's Pretty Baby. A third version is on You're the Best Thing That Ever Happened to Me.
"Gimme a Little Kiss, Will Ya, Huh?" was re-recorded for You're the Best Thing That Ever Happened to Me.
"Smile" was re-recorded for 1973's Sittin' on Top of the World.
"Baby, Won't You Please Come Home" was waxed a second time for 1966's The Dean Martin TV Show and a final time for You're the Best Thing That Ever Happened to Me.

Personnel 
Performance
 Dean Martin – vocals
 Ken Lane - piano
 Barney Kessel - guitar
 Red Mitchell - double bass
 Irving Cottler - drums
Production
 Stan Cornyn - liner notes
 Jimmy Bowen - producer

References 

1964 albums
Dean Martin albums
Albums produced by Jimmy Bowen
Reprise Records albums